Kongulu Mobutu also known as Kongolo Mobutu (c. 1970 – September 24, 1998) was a son of Mobutu Sese Seko, President of Zaire (now the Democratic Republic of the Congo), and an officer in the Special Presidential Division (DSP).

Biography

Early life 
Kongulu (also known as Kongolo) was one of the twenty-one children of President Mobutu Sese Seko. His mother was the President's first wife Marie-Antoinette Gbiatibwa Gogbe Yetene, who died in 1977. He was described as "a stocky, bearded man with a taste for fast cars, gambling and women."

Despotic activity
Kongulo Mobutu was a Captain in the DSP. When he left The School for Officers Training (EFO) in Kananga, he started his career as Second Lieutenant in The Military Service for Action and Intelligence (SARM). As Captain, he was Personal Secretary of General Bolozi in SARM. He was General Bolozi's protegee. Bolozi is married to Kongulu's aunt. Kongulu was a key enforcer in the final years of his father's despotic regime; his brutal treatment of political opponents earned him the nickname "Saddam Hussein".

In his childhood at Camp Tshatshi, Kongulu was nicknamed "Gange". When he was about to finish his matric, his entourage nicknamed him "Vatican" as a state within a state. He did not like it. After an incident which put in him in trouble with his father about money laundering, he fled to Libya and the Middle East. President Mobutu sent a team of his guards to take Kongulu back home. They unsuccessfully returned home. From that short exile, Kongulu took the nickname of Saddam Hussein.

Business activity
Kongulu Mobutu was in charge of various businesses in Zaire, including shipping and import firms, entertainment Yoshad Productions. He exercised a strong influence onto the popular musical band Wenge Musica BCBG of Werrason, Jb Mpiana, Didier Masela. He reconciled Koffi Olomide and Jossart Nyoka Nlongo after a feud. According to a former employee, quoted in a United Nations report, one of his companies, Hyochade, acted as a front for extortion, state propaganda and surveillance of political opponents. The German ZDF network's investigative program Kennzeichen D has claimed that Kongulu participated in the siphoning off of the national wealth by helping to organize the secret movement of gold to Gambia during the 1990s.

Flight from revolution
In April 1997, as forces led by Laurent-Désiré Kabila advanced towards Zaire's capital, Kinshasa, it is alleged that Kongulu Mobutu compiled a list of 500 of his father's opponents who were to be assassinated. When troops entered the city on May 17, Defense Minister, General Donatien Mahele Lieko Bokungu tried to negotiate and was shot dead; it has been claimed that Kongulu had a role in his killing at Camp Tshashi. Kongulu will be later clear of these accusations. 

It is revealed that Kongulu was the one who came to cover General Mahele's body. He came after the action and senior Commanders of the DSP were present during assassination. Kongulu had no influence on DSP soldiers. He was the last most famous person of Mobutu's regime to leave Kinshasa on May 17, 1997, after he tried unsuccessfully to defend his father's rule (he commanded his father's bodyguards to the frontline). Kongulu fled across the border to Brazzaville later that day while rebels were almost 10 km away from the beach. His house was ransacked by soldiers and civilians.

Family
Kongulu was married to Dany Kanyeba Nyembwe and had children together. They lived in Kinshasa.

Death
Kongulu Mobutu died in exile in Monaco on September 24, 1998, aged 28 (a year after he attended his father's funeral at Rabat, Morocco). Former Reuters journalist Michela Wrong has written that he and his brother Nyiwa died of AIDS.

References

1970 births
1998 deaths
Ngbandi people
Democratic Republic of the Congo exiles
Democratic Republic of the Congo expatriates in Monaco
AIDS-related deaths in Monaco
Year of birth uncertain
Children of national leaders
Mobutu Sese Seko